This is the discography of the UK ensemble Icebreaker.

Digital singles 2021
Graham Fitkin – Mesh (re-mastered) (Rookery Records, 29 January 2021)
Steve Martland arr. Icebreaker – Remix (re-mastered) (Rookery Records, 26 February 2021) (Re-master of track from Century XXI UK A–M)
John Godfrey - S.U.S.Y.W.I.M.P.S. (Rookery Records, 26 March 2021) (Re-master of track from Century XXI UK A–M)
Anna Meredith arr. James Poke - Nautilus (Rookery Records, 23 April 2021)
Julia Wolfe arr. James Poke - Big, Beautiful, Dark & Scary (Rookery Records, 21 May 2021)
Michael Gordon & David Lang - Link (Rookery Records, 18 June 2021)
Linda Buckley - Azure (Rookery Records, 16 July 2021)
Kerry Andrew - The, What is it? The Golden Eagle? (Rookery Records, 13 August 2021)
Jlin arr. James Poke - Black Origami (Rookery Records, 10 September 2021)
Anna Meredith arr. James Poke - The Vapours (Rookery Records, 8 October 2021)
 Kate Moore - The Dam (Rookery Records, 5 November 2021)
Philip Glass arr. James Poke - Rubric (Rookery Records, 3 December 2021)

Albums
Official Bootleg (ICC, 1991, live album, cassette only)
John Godfrey – Euthanasia and Garden Implements
Damian LeGassick – Mad Legs In a Sack
Michael Nyman arr J Godfrey – Think Slow, Act Fast
Pete Garvey – Wires
Michael Torke arr J Poke – The Yellow Pages
Michael Gordon – Acid Rain (excerpt)
Diderik Wagenaar – Tam Tam (excerpt)
Louis Andriessen – Hoketus (excerpt)
I D Mellish – Son of Cairn
Terminal Velocity (Argo, 1994)
Michael Gordon – Yo Shakespeare
Louis Andriessen arr J Poke – de Snelheid
Gavin Bryars – The Archangel Trip
Damian LeGassick – Evol
David Lang – Slow Movement
Trance (Argo, 1996)
Michael Gordon – Trance
Rogue's Gallery (New Tone, 1997)
Michael Torke arr T Armstrong & P Wilson – Vanada
David Lang – Cheating, Lying, Stealing
Steve Martland arr J Godfrey – Shoulder to Shoulder
John Godfrey – Euthanasia and Garden Implements
Louis Andriessen – Hoketus (live)
Diderik Wagenaar (Composers' Voice / Donemus, 2001)
Diderik Wagenaar – Metrum
Diderik Wagenaar – Rookery Hill
Diderik Wagenaar – Tam Tam
Extraction (between the lines, 2001)
Damian LeGassick – Mad Legs in a Sack
Gordon McPherson – The Baby Bear's Bed
Mel – Goldylox ("Secret Hidden Bonus Track Mix") Remix of The Baby Bear's Bed
Trance (Cantaloupe Music, 2004)
Remix and re-master of Argo album (same track listing)

Cranial Pavement (Cantaloupe Music, 2005)
Conlon Nancarrow arr J Poke – Study #2b
John Godfrey – Gallows Hill
Yannis Kyriakides – Blindspot
Richard Craig – Chook
Terminal Velocity (Cantaloupe Music, 2005)
Re-master of Argo album (same track listing)

Music with Changing Parts (Orange Mountain Music, 2007)
Philip Glass – Music with Changing Parts

Apollo (Cantaloupe Music, 2012, Firebrand, 2019)
Brian Eno, Roger Eno, Daniel Lanois arr. Woojun Lee – Apollo

Appearances on other albums
Hook, Mesh, Stub, Cud (Argo, 1993)
Graham Fitkin – Mesh
Short Cuts – Breaking the sound Barrier – An Argo Sampler (Argo, 1994)

Includes excerpt from:
Gavin Bryars – The Archangel Trip (from the album Terminal Velocity, original Argo version)
Also contains excerpts of music from other Argo albums by Graham Fitkin, Michael Nyman, David Byrne and others.

Century XXI UK A–M (New Tone, 1996)

Steve Martland – Re-mix
John Godfrey – S.U.S.Y.W.I.M.P.S. (despite the claim on the cover and CD that the piece is Euthanasia...: it is correct in the liner notes)

Bang on a Can plays Louis Andriessen (Cantaloupe Records)

Members of Icebreaker in collaboration with Bang on a Can All-Stars:
Louis Andriessen – Hoketus

References

External links
Icebreaker
Icebreaker Apollo
Cantaloupe Music

Discographies of British artists